Sarath Ambepitiya (November 19, 1946  – November 20, 2004) was a Sri Lankan jurist. He was serving as the Judge of the Colombo High Court when he was assassinated. The assassination, orchestrated by a drug lord sentenced by the Judge, gripped the nation and forced the government to crack down on organized crime.

Education

Educated at the Royal College, Colombo, Ambepitiya entered the Sri Lanka Law College to study law and was called to the bar as an attorney at law.

Career

After practicing law for some time, he joined the judiciary in 1977 and served as a Magistrate in many parts of the island. Later he was appointed Chief Magistrate of Colombo and then Additional District Judge of Colombo. Ambepitiya's first appointment as a High Court Judge was in Galle, after which he was appointed as a High Court Judge in Colombo. He was a noted for his fearlessness in making strong judgments and taking up cases that other judges feared to accept. Ambepitiya presided over many important criminal cases including the Central Bank bombing.

Murder

He was shot dead by assassins at his official residence along with his bodyguard, Police Inspector Upali Bandara, on November 20, 2004. At the time of his death, he was one of the most senior judges of the High Court and was expected to be promoted to the Court of Appeal of Sri Lanka. Only the day before, he celebrated his 58th birthday with a visit to the Kelaniya temple. The Chief Justice described Ambepitiya as "the most fearless judicial officer we had. His death is a great loss to the judiciary". The President later gifted his official residence to his family.

Conviction

Five men were indicted over the murder of Ambepitiya. This included the alleged mastermind, Mohammed Niyas Naufer alias Potta Naufer on charges of conspiracy to commit murder; and Sujith Rohana Rupasinghe, Suminda Nishantha, Udara Perera and Lasantha Kumara, who were alleged to have carried out the murder. On July 4, 2005, amid high security and following a three-month trial,  a High Court Trial-at-Bar reached a unanimous verdict finding the five men guilty of murdering Ambepitiya and his bodyguard. All five were sentenced to death by hanging.

References

External links

 Justice Killed

1946 births
2004 deaths
High Courts of Sri Lanka judges
Sinhalese judges
Sinhalese lawyers
Sri Lankan murder victims
Alumni of Royal College, Colombo
People from British Ceylon
People from Galle
Assassinated Sri Lankan judges